Ayellet Tal (born 1962) is an Israeli researcher in computational geometry and computer graphics who holds the Alfred and Marion Bar Chair in Engineering at the Technion.

Research
Tal's research interests include computational geometry, computer graphics, geometric modeling, and geometry processing. She has also studied the applications of computer vision to archaeology.

Education and career
Tal has a bachelor's degree in mathematics and computer science from Tel Aviv University and a Ph.D. in 1995 in computer science from Princeton University. Her dissertation, Animation and Visualization of Geometric Algorithms, was supervised by David P. Dobkin.

She is a professor of electrical engineering at the Technion – Israel Institute of Technology, and holds the Alfred and Marion Bar Chair in Engineering at the Technion. At the Technion, she is also the advisor for the advancement of women in science and engineering at the university.

Recognition
Tal was a keynote speaker at Computer Graphics International 2015.

References

External links
Home page

Listing of Tal's students

1962 births
Living people
Israeli computer scientists
Israeli women computer scientists
Researchers in geometric algorithms
Academic staff of Technion – Israel Institute of Technology
Tel Aviv University alumni
Princeton University alumni